{{DISPLAYTITLE:C21H24N2}}
The molecular formula C21H24N2 (molar mass: 304.43 g/mol, exact mass: 304.1939 u) may refer to:

 AVN-101
 IMes
 Quinupramine

Molecular formulas